Randy Thomas may refer to:

 Randy Thomas (American football) (born 1976), American football player
 Randy Thomas (cricketer) (born 1982), Barbadian cricketer
 Randy Thomas (musician) (born 1954), American Christian musician